The Missouri–Illinois Railroad was a railroad that operated in Missouri and Illinois. It began operations in 1921, and was owned by the Missouri Pacific Railroad and operated as a subsidiary railroad until it was merged into the Missouri Pacific in 1978.

In 1970 it reported 359 million net ton-miles of revenue freight and zero passengers on 333 miles of road operated (138 miles owned).

References

Predecessors of the Missouri Pacific Railroad
Defunct Illinois railroads
Defunct Missouri railroads
Former Class I railroads in the United States